Yannis Bègue (born 2 January 1982) is a former professional footballer who played as a midfielder.

Club career
Bègue came up through the youth system of Auxerre. He signed a professional contract with Raith Rovers of the Scottish Division One in November 1999 at age 17. He made two substitute appearances during the season. Following the 1999–2000 season he joined Albion Rovers of Scotland's Third Division. He made twelve league appearances and scored two goals throughout the season. He also scored a first-half wonderstrike in a friendly against Motherwell for which he was called a supersub by the BBC.  On 4 August 2001, he was released by Albion at the conclusion of the season.

In 2002 he went to Réunion and had a brief stint with FC Avirons of the Premier League but left because of a contract dispute. At this time he returned to the United Kingdom to find a club along with his Scottish girlfriend but was ultimately unsuccessful. He returned to Réunion the following year and was in contract discussions with Saint-Pierroise.

International career
Bègue represented his native Saint Pierre and Miquelon at the international level, including in matches in 2005.

References

External links
 Soccerbase profile
 National Football Teams profile

1982 births
Living people
French footballers
Saint Pierre and Miquelon footballers
Saint Pierre and Miquelon international footballers
Association football midfielders
AJ Auxerre players
Albion Rovers F.C. players
Raith Rovers F.C. players
French expatriate footballers
French expatriate sportspeople in Scotland
Expatriate footballers in Scotland